The Office of American Innovation (OAI) was an office within the White House Office created by the Trump administration on March 27, 2017.

History
The purpose of the office was to "make recommendations to the President on policies and plans that improve Government operations and services, improve the quality of life for Americans now and in the future, and spur job creation."

The Office was directed by President Trump’s son-in-law Jared Kushner, Senior Advisor to the President. The other members, according to the founding memorandum, are the Assistant to the President and Chief of Staff (John F. Kelly at its establishment and then Mick Mulvaney and Mark Meadows), the Senior Advisor to the President for Policy (Stephen Miller), the Assistant to the President for Economic Policy (Larry Kudlow), the Assistant to the President for Domestic Policy (Andrew Bremberg), the Assistant to the President for Strategic Initiatives (Chris Liddell), the Assistant to the President for Intergovernmental and Technology Initiatives (Brooke Rollins), the Senior Counselor to the President for Economic Initiatives (was Dina Powell - position vacant March 2018), the Assistant to the President for Strategic Communications, the Assistant to the President and Chief of Staff to the Vice President (Nick Ayers), and the Assistant to the President and Staff Secretary (Derek Lyons)

In July 2017, the Office's operational team consisted of Kushner, Liddell, Reed Cordish (the predecessor to Brooke Rollins), and Matt Lira. Communications were run by Josh Raffel, a former Hollywood public relations executive, until February 2018, when Raffel announced his resignation from the position.

In February 2018, Democracy Forward Foundation and Food & Water Watch have brought a complaint against the OAI to compel its compliance with the Freedom of Information Act.

Between April 2019 to November 2020, Ja'Ron Smith served as the office's Deputy Director.

References 

2017 establishments in Washington, D.C.
Presidency of Donald Trump
Presidency of the United States
American Innovation